Lexington County Baseball Stadium is a baseball stadium in Lexington, South Carolina. It is the home field of the Lexington County Blowfish of the Coastal Plain League, a collegiate summer baseball league. The stadium holds 2,573 spectators. The venue hosted the Big South Conference baseball tournament from 2016 through 2018.

The Blowfish operate Lexington County Baseball Stadium year round and holds its front office in the stadium.

The venue includes the Stadium Club, a climate-controlled area that hosts various events in the off-season and is booked as a hospitality area during the summer Blowfish season.

References

College baseball venues in the United States
Sports venues in South Carolina
2015 establishments in South Carolina
Sports venues completed in 2015
Buildings and structures in Lexington County, South Carolina
Baseball venues in South Carolina